Antonie Boubong (1842–1908) was a German portrait, genre, and landscape painter.

Life 
Antonie Boubong was born on 8 June 1842 in Werneck, Bavaria. She studied at the Stuttgart Art School with Wilhelm von Lindenschmit the Younger in Munich.

Antonie Boubong worked in Strasbourg. She had exhibitions in Munich, Berlin, Vienna, and Düsseldorf. She became nationally known when Kaiser William I and Empress Augusta presented one of the annual exhibitions organised by the Verein der Berliner Künstlerinnen at the Akademie der Künste and bought one of her paintings there.

Gallery

References

Citations

Bibliography 

 Oliver, Valerie Cassel, ed. (2011). "Boubong, Antonie". In Benezit Dictionary of Artists. Oxford University Press.
 Vollmer, Hans (1910). "Boubong, Antonie". In Thieme, Ulrich and Becker, Felix (eds.). Allgemeines Lexikon der Bildenden Künstler von der Antike bis zur Gegenwart. 4. Bida–Brevoort. Leipzig: Wilhelm Engelmann. p. 425.
 "Vereinschronik: Allgemein". Verein der Berliner Künstlerinnen 1867 e. V. (n.d.). Retrieved 18 April 2022.

1842 births
1908 deaths
19th-century German women artists
Artists from Bavaria